Campiglia Cervo is a comune (municipality) in the Province of Biella in the Italian region Piedmont, located about  northeast of Turin and about  northwest of Biella.

Campiglia Cervo borders the following municipalities: Andorno Micca, Mosso, Piedicavallo, Quittengo, Rosazza,  Valle Mosso. From 1 January 2016 Campiglia Cervo also encompasses two former neighbouring municipalities, Quittengo and San Paolo Cervo.

Notable buildings 
In the municipality there is a famous sanctuary, the Sacro Monte di Andorno.

Demographic evolution

References